Cathetorhinus melanocephalus  is a species of snake in the Gerrhopilidae family.
It may belong to the genus Rhinotyphlops, but a formal reassignment has yet to be published.

References

Gerrhopilidae
Reptiles described in 1844
Taxa named by André Marie Constant Duméril
Taxa named by Gabriel Bibron